Krzysztof Piotr Kuźniecow (born 16 September 1968) is a Polish former ice hockey player. He played for Polonia Bytom, Zagłębie Sosnowiec, and Cracovia during his career. With Polonia Bytom he won the Polish league championship four times, from 1988 to 1991. He also played for the Polish national team at the 1992 Winter Olympics and the 1992 World Championship.

References

External links
 

1968 births
Living people
Ice hockey players at the 1992 Winter Olympics
KH Zagłębie Sosnowiec players
MKS Cracovia (ice hockey) players
Olympic ice hockey players of Poland
Polish ice hockey forwards
Sportspeople from Bytom
TMH Polonia Bytom players